Alan J. Russell, Ph.D (born August 8, 1962 in Salford, Greater Manchester UK), is Vice President of Biologics for Amgen, one of the world’s leading Biopharmaceutical companies.  Until 2020, Alan was the Highmark Distinguished Career Professor and Director of the Disruptive Health Technology Institute at Carnegie Mellon University.  From 2013 through spring of 2016 he was also the Chief Innovation Officer, Allegheny Health Network.

He is married to Maria Caruso and has five children: Hannah, Nessa, Christian, Trevor, and Emily.

Education 
Russell earned his bachelor's degree in Biochemistry and Applied Molecular Biology from the University of Manchester Institute of Science and Technology in 1984, graduating with Honors, First Class.  In 1987, he completed his Ph.D. in Biological Chemistry from the Imperial College of Science and Technology, University of London. Russell also served as a NATO Research Fellow in Chemistry at MIT (Massachusetts Institute of Technology) from 1987-1989.

Research 
Russell's initial research centered on enzymes and from that study, Russell and his team described the first use of enzymes in ionic liquids.  In addition, the team was the first to describe the use of pressure to control enzyme activity in supercritical fluids, the first stabilization of enzymes for chemical weapon defense and the first use of ATRP to grow polymers from the surface of proteins. Russell also discovered a route to stabilize enzymes by multipoint attachment to polyurethane foams.

His research into ruggedizing enzymes has led to the development of polymer-based protein engineering using ATRP.  Russell’s enzyme stabilization technology was singled out for the U.S. Army's Top Ten Greatest Invention Award and products  containing the core chemistry (such as the Agentase Chemical Agent Detection Kit) are now used to monitor activities in countries suspected of developing and using chemical weapons.

Russell's expertise in regenerative medicine led to an invite to speak at TED2006.  There, Dr. Russell spoke on the potential of regenerative medicine to engineer new tissue and organs to replace sick ones.

Career 
In 1989, Russell joined the faculty of the Department of Chemical Engineering at the University of Pittsburgh as an assistant professor.  Promoted to Associate Professor in 1993, Dr. Russell then went on in 1995 to serve as the Chairman of the Department of Chemical and Petroleum Engineering at the university.

In 1999, Russell became the Founding President of the Tissue Engineering and Regenerative Medicine International Society.

In 2001, Russell joined the McGowan Institute for Regenerative Medicine as its founding director.  In 2012 Russell joined Carnegie Mellon University as the Highmark Distinguished Career Professor in the Department of Biomedical Engineering, as well as, the founding director of the Disruptive Health Technology Institute or DHTI. DHTI is focused on transformational improvements in the affordability, accessibility, quality, and simplicity of health care solutions.  Also in 2012 Russell served as Chair of the College of Fellows for the American Institute for Medical and Biological Engineering, an elected body consisting of the top 2% of medical and bioengineers in the U.S.

Selected works 
Russell is the author of over 200 published works (h-index 62/i10-index 124).

<

Patents 
Russell’s work has led to the awarding of over 20 patents such as:
 J. Huang, A.J. Russell, N.V. Tsarevsky and K. Matyjaszewski. Modification of Surfaces with Polymers, US Patent 8349410, (2013)
 R.R. Koepsel, G. Amitai, A.J. Russell and H. Murata. Decontamination of Chemical and Biological Agents, US Patent Application 13/406,508, (2012)
 A.J. Russell and S.B. Lee. End-to-End Joining of Nanotubes, US Patent 8012278, (2011)
 W.J. Federspiel, A.J. Russell, H.I. Oh and J.L. Kaar. Carbon Dioxide Removal from e.g. Blood using Membrane and Immobilized Carbonic Anhydrase; Artificial Lung for Example, US Patent 7763097, (2010)
 A.J. Russell, R.R. Koepsel and S.B. Lee. Self-assembled nanostructures and methods for preparing the same, US Patent 7666911, (2010)

Honors 
Russell has received many awards and honors, including the following:
 ESWP President’s Award for Engineering Excellence (2014)
 TERMIS Lifetime Achievement Award (2012)
 Rolling Stone 100 (#32 in Top 100 People who will change America) (2009)
 PBT Fastracker Award (2004)
 Ten Greatest Army Inventions (2004)
 Elected Fellow of the American Institute for Medical and Biological Engineers (1998)

Publication editorial boards 
Dr. Russell serves and has served on the editorial board on many industry publications, such as:
 Disruptive Science and Technology (Editor-in-Chief) (2012 – 2014)
 Rejuvenation Research (2012 – Present)
 Journal of Tissue Engineering and Regenerative Medicine (2009 – Present)
 Regenerative Medicine (2008 – Present)
 Tissue Engineering (2008 – 2012)
 IEEE Transactions on NanoBioscience, Senior Editor (2005 – 2008)
 Biocatalysis and Biotransformations, Associate Editor (1998-2003)
 Encyclopedia of Catalysis, Associate Editor (1997-2004)
 Journal Molecular Catalysis B (1995-2001)

Advisory boards 
In 2015 Dr. Russell was the longest serving member on the FDA’s Science Board.  He currently is serving on the board of:
 EPSRC & MRC Centre for Doctoral Training in Regenerative Medicine, International Advisory Board (2014–Present)
 Optix, Science Advisory Board (2014–Present)
 Applicell, Science Advisory Board (2013–Present)
 New Organ Executive Advisory Board (2013–Present)

Active in the community, he also serves on the boards of the British-American Connections Pittsburgh and the Pittsburgh Symphony Orchestra.

References

External links
Disrtuptive Healthcare Technology Institute
TED2006 Talk
Rolling Stones Top 100 People Who Will Change the World
Link to Google Scholar

Carnegie Mellon University faculty
Massachusetts Institute of Technology School of Science alumni
People from Salford
1962 births
Living people
Fellows of the American Institute for Medical and Biological Engineering